Abbot of Tavistock was the title of the abbot of Tavistock Abbey in Devon, England. The name of the first abbot is unknown, but the abbey was founded between 975 and 980. Unless otherwise specified the details in the following table are from Heads of Religious Houses: England & Wales 940–1216.

Notes

References

 
 
 
 

Abbots of Tavistock
Benedictine abbots by monastery
Tavistock